Ariyalur (Tamil: அரியலூர்), is a district in Tamil Nadu, India.

Ariyalur may also refer to:
 Ariyalur district, is a district.
 Ariyalur division, is a revenue division.
 Ariyalur taluk, is a taluk.
 Ariyalur railway station, is a railway station.
 Ariyalur Block, is a revenue block.